Bon Dar or Bondar, in Iran, may refer to:

Hormozgan Province
 Bondar, Iran, Hormozgan Province
 Bondar, Minab, Hormozgan Province
 Bondar Rural District, in Hormozgan Province

Isfahan Province
 Bondar, Isfahan, a village in Fereydunshahr County

Kerman Province
 Bondar-e Gavsin, Kerman Province
 Bondar-e Geshkin, Kerman Province
 Bondar, Kerman, Kerman Province
 Bondar Ziaratgah, Kerman Province

Mazandaran Province
 Bondar-e Olya
 Bondar-e Sofla

Yazd Province
 Bon Dar, Yazd

See also
 Bandar (disambiguation)
 Bandor (disambiguation)